Menilite is a greyish-brown form of the mineraloid opal. It is also known as liver opal or leberopal (German), due to its color. It is called menilite because it was first described from Ménilmontant (Paris), France, where it occurs as concretions within bituminous Early Oligocene Menilite Shales.

See also
 Geyserite
 Hyalite

References

Opals